Farah Kosh-e Sofla (also Romanized as Faraḩ Kosh-e Soflá and Faraḩ Kash-e Soflá) is a village in Zagheh Rural District, Zagheh District, Khorramabad County, Lorestan Province, Iran. At the 2006 census, its population was 52, with 12 families.

References 

Towns and villages in Khorramabad County